National Beverage Corp. is an American beverage developer, manufacturer, and distributor based in Fort Lauderdale, Florida, focused on flavored soft drinks, with its most noted brands being La Croix, Shasta, and Faygo.

History
The company was formed in 1985 by Nick A. Caporella to fend off an unwanted acquisition by Victor Posner of Burnup & Sims Inc., an installer of cable television and telecommunications systems, through trading stock between the two companies to reduce Posner's ownership level. Caporella, now having an additional company, needed to have a business to go with it and acquired Shasta Beverages from Sara Lee Corporation in 1985 for US$40 million in cash and Burnup & Sims shares. To make National a major player, Caporella purchased Faygo, a Midwest regional soft drink manufacturer, from Tree Sweet Products Corp. With its 12 bottling plants, National subsidiaries branched out into bottling store brands.

In 1991, National Beverage went public to sell Burnup & Sims's shares in National Beverage, which was partially successful. A Burnup & Sims stockholder sued due to Caporella's salary from Burnup and percentage of revenue from National Beverage, forcing Caporella to spend less time managing the company. In the early 1990s, Spree, an all-natural, carbonated soft drink, and Big Shot, a regional, multiflavored soft drink line, were acquired. In 1992, the US Navy contracted for the manufacture of "Sea", their ship store's brand. In the mid-1990s, juice producer, Everfresh Beverages Inc. and WinterBrook Corp., a carbonated and still water producer, became subsidiaries of National. WinterBrook brought three brands to the National Beverage group of companies: Cascadia, WinterBrook Clear, and LaCroix. National acquired Home Juice Company, home of the Home Juice and Mr. Pure brands, at the end of the 1990s.

In the early 2000s, National purchased Beverage Canners International Inc., Ritz, and Crystal Bay soft drinks and sparkling waters brands owner. In 2002, the company changed its strategy by focusing on bottling its own brands and end private-label bottling. National moved to create new products for specific markets starting in 2003 with Shasta Shortz, a kid-focused soda. Also that year, Fruitika, a fruit nectars line, went out to the stores. In 2004, Diet Shasta started using Splenda No Calorie Sweetener.

National also launched new energy drink lines starting with Rip It, a general energy drink line. A woman-focused line, Chic, and Freek for teenagers and young adults, soon followed. National also tried a coffee-based energy drink, Triple Hit.

List of brands

 Shasta
 Faygo
 Everfresh
 La Croix Sparkling Water
 Rip It
 ClearFruit
 Mr. Pure
 Ritz
 Crystal Bay
 Cascadia Sparkling Clear
 Ohana Punch
 Big Shot
 Double Hit

References

External links

Food and drink companies established in 1985
Drink companies of the United States
Companies based in Fort Lauderdale, Florida
Companies listed on the Nasdaq
Food and drink companies based in Florida
1985 establishments in Florida
1991 initial public offerings